Miss USA 1957 was the 6th Miss USA pageant, held at Long Beach Municipal Auditorium, Long Beach, California on July 17, 1957, during the run-up to the year's Miss Universe pageant. 

Scandal and dethronement
At the end of the pageant, Mary Leona Gage of Maryland was declared the winner and was crowned by the outgoing titleholder, Miss Universe 1956 Carol Morris, of Iowa.  

The following day, rumors about Gage's past and current circumstances began to circulate, and an investigation was launched by pageant organisers. It was discovered that Gage was 18 (not 21 as she had claimed), while her mother and her mother-in-law confirmed she had been married twice and was the mother of two young children.

As all of these were violations of multiple contest eligibility rules, Gage was immediately disqualified, and the title and the associated prize package automatically passed to the 1st runner-up, Charlotte Sheffield of Utah. The other three finalists were moved one place, and the highest-scoring semi-finalist, Kathryn Gabriel of Ohio, became the 4th runner-up. 

Unfortunately, by the time the scandal broke publicly, the Miss Universe preliminary judging had already taken place, with Gage chosen as a semi-finalist, and allowed to participate pending the results of the investigation. It was too late for Sheffield to compete, and it would be the only time the United States has not been represented at the Miss Universe pageant.  

Later that year, Sheffield was sent to London as the USA contestant for Miss World 1957, but she failed to place.

Results

Historical significance 
 Maryland wins competition for the first time, also becoming the sixth state to do so; the title was later stripped after it was discovered that the winner was married and had two children.
 Utah  wins competition for the first time. Besides it became the 7th state who does it for the first time. She finished as 1st runner-up, but succeeded as Miss USA 1957 after the winner was disqualified.
 West Virginia earns the 1st runner-up position for the first time. She finished as 2nd runner-up, but succeeded to 1st runner-up when the 1st runner-up became Miss USA. 
 Nevada earns the 2nd runner-up position for the first time. She finished as 3rd runner-up, but succeeded to 2nd runner-up when the 2nd runner-up took the 1st runner-up position.
 Nebraska earns the 3rd runner-up position for the second time and repeats the same placement as the previous year. She finished as 4th runner-up, but succeeded to 3rd runner-up when the 3rd runner-up took the 2nd runner-up position.
 Ohio earns the 4th runner-up position for the first time. She finished in the 6th place and obtained the highest-scoring of the semifinalists. Later due to the other finalists were moved one place up she became the 4th runner-up.
 States that placed in semifinals the previous year were Arkansas, Iowa, Maryland, Nebraska, Ohio, South Carolina,  Texas, Utah and Washington.
 Nebraska, South Carolina and Texas placed for the fifth consecutive year. 
 Arkansas placed for the fourth consecutive year. 
 Washington placed for the third consecutive year. 
 Iowa, Maryland, Ohio and Utah made their second consecutive placement.
 California, Illinois and New York last placed in 1955.
 Nevada last placed in 1953.
 Massachusetts and West Virginia placed for the first time.
 Colorado breaks an ongoing streak of placements since 1955.

Delegates
The Miss USA 1957 delegates were:

States

 Arkansas - Helen Garrott
 California - Peggy Jacobson
 Colorado - Mary Clapham
 Connecticut - Rosemary Galliotti
 Delaware - Patricia Ellingsworth
 Florida - Deanie Cates
 Georgia - Ruth Lycan
 Illinois - Marianne Gaba
 Indiana - Pat Dorsett
 Iowa - Judith Hall
 Louisiana - Earlyn Regouffre
 Maine - Roberta Aymie
 Maryland - Mary Leona Gage
 Massachusetts - Sandra Ramsey
 Michigan - Sharon Moore
 Minnesota - Mary Ford
 Missouri - Judith Murback
 Nebraska - Carolyn McGirr
 Nevada - Joan Adams
 New Hampshire - Lyla Moran
 New Jersey - Jeanne Lewis
 New Mexico - Patricia Stafford
 New York - Sanita Pelkey
 North Carolina - Peggy Ann Dennis
 North Dakota - Anne-Marit Studness
 Ohio - Kathryn Gabriel
 Oklahoma - Rose Mary Raab
 Oregon - Sonja Landsem
 Pennsylvania - Rosalie Culp
 Rhode Island - Myrna Altieri
 South Carolina - Jean Spotts
 South Dakota - Gay Marshall
 Tennessee - Patricia Prather
 Texas - Gloria Hunt
 Utah - Charlotte Sheffield
 Vermont - Marjorie Link
 Virginia - Patricia Bush
 Washington - Diana Schafer
 West Virginia - Ruth Parr
 Wisconsin - Natalie Lueck
 Wyoming - Marilyn Hawkins

Cities
Miami Beach, Florida - Faye Ray
Philadelphia, Pennsylvania - Barbara Miller
St. Louis, Missouri - Carole Learn

References

External links 
 Miss USA official website
 Detailed narrative of the 1957 Miss USA/Miss Universe pageant

1957
1957 in the United States
1957 beauty pageants
1957 in California
1957